The 1911 Toronto Argonauts season was the 28th season for the team since the franchise's inception in 1873. The team finished in first place in the Interprovincial Rugby Football Union with a 5–1 record and qualified for the playoffs. After defeating the Hamilton Alerts in the Eastern Final, the Argonauts lost the 3rd Grey Cup to the Toronto Varsity Blues.

Coach Joe Lee unexpectedly resigned on October 4, two days before the first league game, and was replaced the next day by ex-University of Toronto quarterback Billy Foulds.

Pre-season and Exhibition

Regular season

Standings

Schedule

Postseason

Grey Cup

November 25 @ Varsity Stadium (Attendance: 13,687)

References

Toronto Argonauts seasons